The fourth Annual Pop Corn Music Awards for 1994, in Athens, Greece. The awards recognised the most popular artists and albums in Greece from the year 1994 as voted by readers of Greek music publication Pop Corn. The event was hosted by singer Sophia Vossou in March 1995. The Pop Corn Music Awards were discontinued in 2002.

Performances

Winners and nominees

References 

1994
1994 music awards